Pankow-Heinersdorf is a railway station in the Pankow district of Berlin. It is also served by BVG tram route 50. It serves the Heinersdorf region to the north of the centre of Pankow.

History 
Pankow-Heinersdorf station was opened on 1 October 1893. The station was one of the first S-Bahn stations, as S-Bahn services started operated upon the electrification of the line in 1924. On 25 April 1945, the S-Bahn ceased operation as a result of the Soviet invasion of Berlin. Services resumed from Pankow-Heinersdorf on 11 June 1945.

Services 
This station is served by the following services:

 Berlin S-Bahn services  Bernau – Karow – Pankow – Gesundbrunnen – Friedrichstraße – Potsdamer Platz – Sudkreuz – Blankenfelde
 Berlin S-Bahn services  Birkenwerder - Blankenburg - Pankow - Ostkreuz - Schöneweide - Grünau

References

Pankow-Heinersdorf
Pankow-Heinersdorf
Pankow-Heinersdorf
Berlin PankowHeinersdorf